The Union of the Vietnamese Student Associations of Southern California (Vietnamese:Tổng Hội Sinh Viên Việt Nam Nam Cali, often abbreviated as UVSA) is a 501(c)(3) non-profit, non-partisan, community-based and youth-oriented organization designed to provide a united voice for Vietnamese American youth. While based in Little Saigon, organization is a cumulative organization of Vietnamese Student Associations at various Southern California universities and colleges. Its programs include the promotion and retention of Vietnamese language and culture among the Vietnamese youth community, especially through the inter-school support of the Vietnamese Culture Shows, fostering social networking among the different VSAs and participation in the philanthropic work of the Vietnamese community.

UVSA is most famous for organizing the largest Vietnamese Tết Festival in the United States each year.

UVSA of Southern California currently represents 14 collegiate Vietnamese Student Associations/Union and the Vietnamese American High School Alliance, which consists of high school VSAs.

History 

UVSA was founded in 1982 as a means for youth to organize socially and politically within the community. Committed to cultural awareness, educating peers, and community service, UVSA is composed of volunteers including alumni, young professionals, educators, and college and high school students.

Organization structure 
UVSA as an organization is typically categorized into three sections: Executive Board, Inter-Collegiate Council, and Staff.

Executive board 
There are typically five executive board members who address the concerns of its members as well as the community. The five positions are President, External Vice, Internal Vice President, Secretary and Treasurer. The role of the executive board operates with appointed staff who fill the Director and Coordinators roles, whom each operate their own staff or project. Such projects include Project LEAD and Tet Festival.

Current executive board 
The following are the current executive board members of UVSA.

President - Sarah Ho (2017-2019)

Treasurer - Nemo Hababag (2017-2019)

Secretary - Julie T. Nguyen (Temporary)

Inter-Collegiate Council 
The ICC is responsible for the planning of inter-collegiate activities and providing member schools with opportunities to network with students from other campuses.

Staff 
Staff is shortened to refer to anyone involved in UVSA who is a director, coordinator, team lead, or member of a respective project. Even though UVSA gains most recognition and public notice because of UVSA Tet Festival, the festival itself is only one project underneath UVSA.

Project LEAD 
Project LEAD (Leadership Education and Development)  is one of many UVSA projects programs. Project LEAD was founded as part of UVSA in 1990 as a general Vietnamese summer culture camp, Trại Hè Về Với Non Sông brought together youth from across Southern California to enjoy a weekend of fun and excitement.  As of today, Project LEAD houses multiple project programs, such as The UVSA/VAHSA Camp, Anh Chi Em, and Summit.

Project LEAD programs

Camp 
This camp focuses on the importance of community cohesion and unity; provides an opportunity for students to network with each other and establish skills that reinforce mutual collaboration; and instills an appreciation for the Vietnamese American identity, cultural heritage and a sense of belonging.

In 2001, these leaders transitioned away from an open camp to UVSA Camp which specifically targeted collegiate VSA leaders. In 2003, UVSA Mike Vu and Vu Dinh wanted to take what they had been learning at prior UVSA Camps and expand on camp programming to give back to our younger brothers and sisters in high school. They founded Project LEAD  which would be the umbrella project to UVSA Camp and then newly introduced VAHSA Camp.

Anh Chi Em (ACE) 
The Anh Chi Em (ACE) is a mentorship program that was established in 2010 to provide High School students guidance and support as well as having a role model in their life. We also encourage higher education and development in leadership, social, and intellectual skills.

Through this "little brother/sister" program, the intention was to provide guidance and sanctuary for the future leaders in our community and other communities as well. The program aims to continue to progress each year and help create a project that could potentially grow into a community staple.

Summit 
Held on September 24, 2016, at California State University, Fullerton. UVSA Summit is a one-day event to develop technical and professional skills specific to leadership officer positions. With this year's theme, "Pride and Legacy," the aim was to inspire officers within UVSA to be proud of their dedication and commitment to their respective communities and leave a lasting legacy for generations to come.

Other project programs

Vietnamese Culture Night Initiative 
Formed by various Vietnamese Culture Night director who are part alumni of various member schools, the purpose of the program was steadily push and deal with the various Vietnamese culture night showcases within Southern California, to ensure that they produce a quality performance without the loss of heritage and culture.

Project U 
Formed originally as means to showcase UVSA members dance talent, Project U was revived in 2016 to be a modern dance team.

Collective Philanthropy Project 
Alongside with multiple regions and UNAVSA, UVSA has assisted since 2005 helping fund raise in the UNAVSA Collective Philanthropy Project.

Tet Festival 

UVSA's Tet Festival is organized each year to celebrate the Vietnamese Lunar New Year. With as many as 100,000 attendees joining this 3-day celebration, it is the largest Vietnamese New Year festival outside of Vietnam. The festival usually includes many cultural booths, carnival rides, a replica of a Vietnamese village and three days of entertainment programs ranging from famous Vietnamese celebrities, martial arts performances to pageant shows and contests. Throughout the years, the festival has taken place in various cities. From the year 2000 to 2013, the festival had resided in Garden Grove Park in the city of Garden Grove, CA . In 2014, the festival moved to its new home at the OC Fair & Event Center in the city of Costa Mesa, CA.

Miss Vietnam of Southern California 
As part of the UVSA Tet Festival, the female beauty pageant, known as Miss Vietnam of Southern California (MVSC) is also hosted and held at UVSA Tet Festival. The current winner, or Queen, is Ashley Hoang

Non Song 
Socal UVSA produces a free annual Tet magazine called Non Sông. Electronic versions of this student-run magazine
are made available on the organization's website, while hard copies are passed out for free at the Tet Festival.

Creation of UNAVSA 
During the Third International Vietnamese Youth Conference in 2003 in San Diego, there were initial talks for creating a network of Vietnamese Student Associations in North America modeled after the Federal Vietnamese Students Association of Australia. Through a collaboration of the Union of Vietnamese Student Associations of Southern Californiaalong with the New England Intercollegiate Vietnamese Student Association, the first North American Vietnamese Student Associations (NAVSA) conference was held in the Summer of 2004 in Boston, and with that NAVSA was born. Only with the second conference in 2005 in Chicago, was the name of NAVSA changed to The Union of North American Vietnamese Student Associations (UNAVSA) to better reflect that nature of this organization as a union.

Public stances 
As UVSA is a 501(c)(3) organization, it can not have any political affiliation. However, certain stances and statements can be addressed.

California Resolution SCR 89 
 This measure would designate the Beach Boulevard Interchange on
 State Highway Route 22 in the County of Orange as the Nguyen Ngoc Phu
 Human Rights Memorial Interchange. The measure would request the
 Department of Transportation to determine the cost of appropriate
 signs showing this designation and, upon receiving donations from
 nonstate sources covering that cost, to erect those signs.

Nguyen Ngoc Phu 
In 2001, Nguyen Ngoc Phu visited Vietnam and witnessed the poverty challenging the Vietnamese people. Through his experience, Phu committed himself to helping the Vietnamese people by becoming involved and leading student organizations.  Nguyen Ngoc Phu organized a two-day hunger strike to protest human rights and religious freedom violations in Vietnam in 2002.  Among his work within the community, Phu was UVSA External Vice President and chaired the Tet Festival in Garden Grove, California in 2005, with 50 organizations and hundreds of students participating in an event that gathered tens of thousands of people worldwide.  In addition, he also reached out to young Vietnamese Americans by hosting a weekly radio program entitled “Tieng Noi Sinh Vien” (Student Voice) on Sai Gon Radio Hai Ngoai (Saigon Radio Overseas).

Nguyen Ngoc Phu graduated with a Bachelor of Science degree in biology from the California State University, Fullerton (CSUF) on May 29, 2005.  About one week later, on June 7, 2005, Nguyen Ngoc Phu received an acceptance letter into UCLA Medical School program.  In addition, the Vietnamese Heritage and Freedom Flag Resolution in Orange County recognizing Yellow Flag with Three Red Stripes as a symbol of the Vietnamese community passed that very same day.  Phu was instrumental in the drafting and passing of this resolution by the Orange County Board of Supervisors.  On that very same day, Nguyen Ngoc Phu's life ended unexpectedly from a heart failure, at the young age of 21.

United against human trafficking 
As student organizations and volunteers make up the membership of UVSA, fundraisers are all encouraged but also restricted. In 2012, as some of the beneficiaries and donation projects worked under UVSA dealt with the prevention of human trafficking in Vietnam, UVSA as well as it constituents in solidarity enacted that all date auction type fundraisers are to be forbidden.

Non-profit 
Each year, UVSA allocates a portion of the UVSA Tet Festival net profits to the Tet Community Assistance Fund. The festival would not be possible without the support of the community and as such, UVSA wishes to ensure the continued growth and support of the community by offering grants to organizations across Southern California. UVSA carefully reviews over one hundred proposals each year from Southern California non-profit organizations that address the needs of the community. Grants are awarded up to $5,000. Over the past 14 years, UVSA has awarded over $1.25 million to community organizations.

Amounts allocated for grants 
2015 - UVSA staff voted to allocate half of the net profit, $93,404.98, to the Tet Community Assistance Fund.

2016 - Of the $81,295.29 in profit, UVSA staff allocated $20,000 to be awarded as grants for the 2016 year.

See also 
 Vietnamese Student Association
 International Vietnamese Youth Conference

References

Vietnamese-American culture in California
Vietnamese community organizations
Vietnamese students' associations
Overseas Vietnamese organizations in the United States